The 1983–84 NHL season was the 67th season of the National Hockey League. The Edmonton Oilers de-throned the four-time defending Stanley Cup champion New York Islanders four games to one in the Cup finals.

League business
Not since World War II travel restrictions caused the NHL to drop regular season overtime games in 1942–43 had the NHL used overtime to decide regular season games. Starting this season, the NHL introduced a five-minute extra period of overtime following the third period in the event of a tied game. A team losing in overtime would get no points. This rule remained in effect until the 1999–2000 season, where a team losing in overtime was awarded 1 point.  If the game remained tied after the five-minute extra period, it remained a tie, until the NHL shootout arrived in the 2005–06 season. Overtime in the Stanley Cup playoffs remained unchanged.

In the entry draft, Brian Lawton became the first American to be chosen first overall, by the Minnesota North Stars. Three Americans were chosen in the top five: Lawton, Pat Lafontaine (third) and Tom Barrasso (fifth). Sylvain Turgeon was chosen second and Steve Yzerman was chosen fourth overall. The St. Louis Blues did not participate in the draft, having been "orphaned" by Ralston Purina. The NHL took control of the franchise after the draft. On July 27, 1983, Harry Ornest purchased the Blues for US$3 million.

Arthur M. Wirtz, long-time chairman and part-owner of the Chicago Black Hawks, died at the age of 82 on July 21, 1983. His son, Bill, took over ownership of the team.

Regular season
The Edmonton Oilers ran away with the best record in the league, and for the third straight year set a new record for most goals in a season, 446. The Oilers' new captain, Wayne Gretzky, was once again breaking records and rewriting his name into the record book. This season saw Gretzky score at least one point in the first 51 games of the season. During those 51 games, Gretzky had 61 goals and 92 assists for 153 points, which is equivalent to exactly three points per game. He also won his fifth straight Hart Trophy and his fourth straight Art Ross Trophy. The season's second leading scorer was Gretzky's teammate Paul Coffey, who, with 126 points, became the third defenceman to score 100 points in a season.

The Calgary Flames played their inaugural season at the Olympic Saddledome.

Prior to the season, the St. Louis Blues were purchased by Harry Ornest, keeping the team from folding after a proposed move to Saskatoon, Saskatchewan was rejected by the NHL Board of Governors. In addition, the team's home venue, the Checkerdome, reverted to its original name, the Arena, after six seasons.

Final standings
Note: GP = Games played; W = Wins; L = Losses; T = Ties; GF = Goals for; GA = Goals against; Pts = Points; PIM = Penalties in minutes

Prince of Wales Conference

Clarence Campbell Conference

Playoffs

Playoff bracket

Stanley Cup Finals

It was a rematch of the 1983 final as the Islanders attempted to match the 1950s Montreal Canadiens and win five consecutive Stanley Cup championships, against the Edmonton Oilers attempting to win the franchise's first championship. The Islanders lost the first game at home 1–0, but came back to defeat the Oilers 6–1 in the second game. Edmonton took over the series from that point, winning the next three games, all played in Edmonton.

This season's finals adopted the 2–3–2 home ice format, rather than the usual 2–2–1–1–1 format.

Awards

All-Star teams

Source: NHL.

Player statistics

Scoring leaders
Note: GP = Games played; G = Goals; A = Assists; Pts = Points

Source: NHL.

Leading goaltenders

Note: GP = Games played; Min – Minutes played; GA = Goals against; GAA = Goals against average; W = Wins; L = Losses; T = Ties; SO = Shutouts

Coaches

Patrick Division
New Jersey Devils: Bill MacMillan and Tom McVie
New York Islanders: Al Arbour
New York Rangers: Herb Brooks
Philadelphia Flyers: Bob McCammon and Mike Keenan
Pittsburgh Penguins: Lou Angotti
Washington Capitals: Bryan Murray

Adams Division
Boston Bruins: Gerry Cheevers
Buffalo Sabres: Scotty Bowman
Hartford Whalers: Larry Pleau
Montreal Canadiens: Bob Berry and Jacques Lemaire
Quebec Nordiques: Michel Bergeron

Norris Division
Chicago Black Hawks: Orval Tessier
Detroit Red Wings: Nick Polano
Minnesota North Stars: Glen Sonmor
St. Louis Blues: Jacques Demers
Toronto Maple Leafs: Mike Nykoluk

Smythe Division
Calgary Flames: Bob Johnson
Edmonton Oilers: Glen Sather
Los Angeles Kings: Don Perry, Rogatien Vachon and Roger Neilson
Vancouver Canucks: Roger Neilson and Harry Neale
Winnipeg Jets: Tom Watt and Barry Long

Milestones

Debuts
The following is a list of players of note who played their first NHL game in 1983–84 (listed with their first team, asterisk(*) marks debut in playoffs):
Tom Barrasso, Buffalo Sabres
Chris Chelios, Montreal Canadiens
Geoff Courtnall, Boston Bruins
Russ Courtnall, Toronto Maple Leafs
Brian Curran, Boston Bruins
Ken Daneyko, New Jersey Devils
Bruce Driver, New Jersey Devils
Patrick Flatley, New York Islanders
Doug Gilmour, St. Louis Blues
Dirk Graham, Minnesota North Stars
Kelly Hrudey, New York Islanders
Pat LaFontaine, New York Islanders
Brian Lawton, Minnesota North Stars
Claude Lemieux, Montreal Canadiens
Doug Lidster, Vancouver Canucks
Hakan Loob, Calgary Flames
John MacLean, New Jersey Devils
Marty McSorley, Pittsburgh Penguins
Cam Neely, Vancouver Canucks
James Patrick, New York Rangers
Bob Rouse, Minnesota North Stars
Peter Sundstrom, New York Rangers
Sylvain Turgeon, Hartford Whalers
Carey Wilson, Calgary Flames
Steve Yzerman, Detroit Red Wings

Last games
The following is a list of players of note that played their last game in the NHL in 1983–84 (listed with their last team):
Guy Lapointe, Boston Bruins
Tony Esposito, Chicago Black Hawks
Rick MacLeish, Detroit Red Wings
Billy Harris, Los Angeles Kings
Blaine Stoughton, New York Rangers
Bill Barber, Philadelphia Flyers
Bobby Clarke, Philadelphia Flyers
Guy Chouinard, St. Louis Blues
Michel Larocque, St. Louis Blues
Dale McCourt, Toronto Maple Leafs
Mike Palmateer, Toronto Maple Leafs
Darcy Rota, Vancouver Canucks

See also 
 List of Stanley Cup champions
 1983 NHL Entry Draft
 1983–84 NHL transactions
 36th National Hockey League All-Star Game
 NHL All-Star Game
 NHL All-Rookie Team
 Ice hockey at the 1984 Winter Olympics
 1983 in sports
 1984 in sports

References
 
 
 
 
 

Notes

External links

Hockey Database
NHL.com
hockey-reference

 
1
1